William 'Wille' Munn (born 29 August 1934) was a Scottish footballer who played for Stenhousemuir, Stirling Albion, Cowdenbeath and Dumbarton.

References

1934 births
Scottish footballers
Dumbarton F.C. players
Stenhousemuir F.C. players
Stirling Albion F.C. players
Cowdenbeath F.C. players
Scottish Football League players
Living people
Association football forwards